Tom Hersey is an American football coach who served as head football coach at Canisius College.

Hersey played freshman football at Cornell University, before transferring to the University at Buffalo and playing for the Buffalo Bulls football team. Hersey served as the head football coach at Canisius College from 1982 to 1991. He is Canisius football's all-time winningest coach, passing Luke Urban with a record of 49–42–2.

Head coaching record

References

Year of birth missing (living people)
Living people
Buffalo Bulls football players
Canisius Golden Griffins football coaches
Cornell Big Red football players